|}

 

The Champion Hurdle is a Grade 1 National Hunt hurdle race in Great Britain which is open to horses aged four years or older. It is run on the Old Course at Cheltenham over a distance of about 2 miles and ½ furlong (2 miles and 87 yards, or ), and during its running there are eight hurdles to be jumped. The race is the last leg of the Triple Crown of Hurdling and is scheduled to take place each year on the opening day of the Cheltenham Festival in March.

As its title suggests, the Champion Hurdle is the most prestigious hurdling event in the National Hunt calendar. Its list of winners features many of the most highly acclaimed hurdlers in the sport's history, and several of these, such as National Spirit, Istabraq, Hatton's Grace, Persian War and Lanzarote, have had races named in their honour.

As part of a sponsorship agreement with the online gambling operator Unibet, the race is now known as the Unibet Champion Hurdle.

History
The first Champion Hurdle was run in 1927, and its inaugural winner, Blaris, was awarded prize money of £365. In its second year the event was won by Brown Jack, who subsequently became a prolific winner of long-distance flat races. The Champion Hurdle was abandoned in 1931 due to persistent frost, and in 1932 it was contested by just three horses – the smallest field in its history. The race was cancelled twice during World War II, in 1943 and 1944.

The 1947 renewal paved the way for a golden era in the Champion Hurdle with just 3 winners until 1955 – National Spirit, Hatton's Grace and Sir Ken, all of them etched into the list of greatest ever hurdlers. Even though it was postponed twice because of winter snows, taking place in mid-April, it proved most popular with a record attendance at that time of 30,000 racing fans. The winner National Spirit became the second horse to retain the hurdling crown while the runner-up to him, a bay horse called Le Paillon trained by Alec Head's father, went on to race on the flat and won the Prix de l'Arc de Triomphe the same year.

As National Spirit was winning his second Champion Hurdle, the horse down the field, Hatton's Grace, trained by one of the most important figures in horse racing Vincent O'Brien, was about to make history and improved for the next seasons to become the first hat-trick winner of the race. The achievement of Hatton's Grace was soon to be matched by Sir Ken, who recorded three successive victories in the 1950s. Before the second of these Sir Ken was given a starting price of 2/5 (a £5 bet would have won £2). He is the shortest-priced horse to have won the race.

The 1970s produced another golden era of hurdling with the third Champion Hurdle triple winner Persian War and the exploits of double champions in Night Nurse, Monksfield, Bula and Comedy of Errors, who was the first horse to win two non-consecutive titles. The Racing Post declared the 1977 running to be the "strongest of fields ever assembled", with Night Nurse beating two other subsequent dual Champion Hurdle winners in Sea Pigeon and Monksfield.

The 1984 winner, Dawn Run, became the second mare to win the Champion Hurdle. In the same year she also won the Irish and French versions of the event, and two seasons later she won the most prestigious chase in National Hunt racing, the Cheltenham Gold Cup. She remains the only horse to have completed the Champion Hurdle-Gold Cup double. From 1985 to 1987 the Champion Hurdle was dominated by See You Then, who became the event's fourth three-time winner. The sixth and most recent mare to win the race was Honeysuckle, the winner of the 2021 and 2022 renewals.

The last triple winner of the Champion Hurdle was Istabraq, whose successes came in 1998, 1999 and 2000. In the early weeks of 2001 he was the odds-on favourite to win the race again, for an unprecedented fourth time. However, this opportunity was lost as the entire Cheltenham Festival was cancelled that year because of an outbreak of foot-and-mouth disease. Istabraq returned for the 2002 running, but on this occasion he failed to complete the race, and he was retired thereafter.

Commercial sponsorship of the Champion Hurdle began in 1978, and it was initially backed by Waterford Crystal. The Smurfit (now known as the Smurfit Kappa Group), began supporting the race in 1991 and from 2010 to 2017 was sponsored by StanJames.com. Stan James's parent company Unibet became the title sponsor from the 2018 running. The race is the final leg of the Road to Cheltenham, a series of high-class hurdles races consisting of the Fighting Fifth Hurdle, the International Hurdle and the Champion Hurdle Trial.

The Champion Hurdle has been continually run on a Tuesday since 1980. The 1927 race was run on a Wednesday, followed by a Thursday in 1928 and then Tuesday from 1929 to 1939. The race moved to Wednesday for 1940 and 1941 followed by rare Saturday runnings in 1942 and 1945. Tuesday became the established day for the Champion Hurdle from 1946 to 1960, with the exception of the postponed races in 1947 (Saturday) and 1955 (Wednesday). From 1961 to 1979 the race was always run on a Wednesday, except in 1964 when it took place on Friday for the only time in its history.

Records
Most successful horse (3 wins):
 Hatton's Grace – 1949, 1950, 1951
 Sir Ken – 1952, 1953, 1954
 Persian War – 1968, 1969, 1970
 See You Then – 1985, 1986, 1987
 Istabraq – 1998, 1999, 2000

Leading jockey (4 wins):
 Tim Molony – Hatton's Grace (1951), Sir Ken (1952, 1953, 1954)
 Ruby Walsh – Hurricane Fly (2011, 2013), Faugheen (2015), Annie Power (2016)
 Barry Geraghty - Punjabi (2009), Jezki (2014), Buveur D'Air (2018), Epatante (2020)

Leading trainer (9 wins):
 Nicky Henderson – See You Then (1985, 1986, 1987), Punjabi (2009), Binocular (2010), Buveur D'Air (2017, 2018), Epatante (2020), Constitution Hill (2023)

Leading owner (9 wins):
 J. P. McManus – Istabraq (1998, 1999, 2000), Binocular (2010), Jezki (2014), Buveur D'Air (2017, 2018), Espoir d'Allen (2019), Epatante (2020)

List of renewals
 Winning mares indicated by †
 Winning trainers based in Great Britain unless indicated (IRE) = Ireland

See also
 Horse racing in Great Britain
 List of British National Hunt races

References

Racing Post:

 Champion Hurdle – Cheltenham Pedigree Online

External links
 Race Recordings

Bibliography
 
 

 
National Hunt races in Great Britain
Cheltenham Racecourse
National Hunt hurdle races
Recurring sporting events established in 1927
1927 establishments in England
Annual sporting events in the United Kingdom
March sporting events